Coleophora idaeella is a moth of the family Coleophoridae. It is found from Fennoscandia and northern Russia to the Pyrenees and the Alps and from Great Britain to Poland.

The wingspan is 13–15 mm for males and 11.5–13.5 mm for females.

The larvae feed on Vaccinium vitis-idaea. Full-grown larvae live in a bivalved composite leaf case composed of three leaf fragments of increasing age and decreasing size. The case is about 10 mm long with a mouth angle of about 60°. The larvae overwinter twice. Full-grown larvae can be found in May.

References

idaeella
Moths described in 1869
Moths of Europe
Taxa named by Ottmar Hofmann